Theodoros Tounousidis (born January 13, 1984) is a Swedish-born Greek wrestler who competed for the men's Greco-Roman 96 kg (heavyweight division) at the 2008 Summer Olympics in Beijing. Tounousidis received a bye for the second round, before losing out to Georgia's Ramaz Nozadze, with a technical score of 1–3, and a classification point score of 1–3.

Tounousidis eventually won the silver medal for the heavyweight category at the 2009 Mediterranean Games in Pescara, Italy, losing out to Turkey's Serkan Ozden. He is also a member of Spårvägens BK in Stockholm, Sweden, being coached and trained by Ryszard Swierad. He is fluent in Greek, English, German, and Swedish.

References

External links
NBC 2008 Olympics profile

Living people
Olympic wrestlers of Greece
Wrestlers at the 2008 Summer Olympics
Greek male sport wrestlers
1984 births
Sportspeople from Stockholm
Swedish people of Greek descent
Wrestlers at the 2015 European Games
European Games competitors for Greece
Swedish male sport wrestlers
Mediterranean Games silver medalists for Greece
Competitors at the 2009 Mediterranean Games
Mediterranean Games medalists in wrestling